Provision(s) may refer to:

 Provision (accounting), a term for liability in accounting
 Provision (contracting), a term for a procurement condition
 Provision (album), an album by Scritti Politti
 A term for the distribution, storing and/or rationing of supplies typically food or drink: 
 Ground provisions, root vegetables used in Caribbean cuisine

See also
 Provisioning (disambiguation)
 Proviso (disambiguation)